Vestavia Hills High School (VHHS), founded in 1970, is a public high school in Vestavia Hills, Alabama, a suburb of Birmingham, Alabama, USA. It is part of the Vestavia Hills City Schools.

History
The land was acquired by Louis Pizitz, a Polish immigrant who settled in Birmingham in 1889. Pizitz lived here with his wife, Minnie and their son, Hortense. After their death, their son Hortense sold the land to the City of Vestavia Hills in the 1960s.

The school was built in the 1970s, in the context of the establishment of segregation academies in the 1970s, which enabled white children to segregate themselves from black children, who remained in public schools. Until 2016 the school mascot, known as Rebel Man, was a plantation owner. The school "picked a Confederate Flag-waving Civil War Rebel because it saw itself as rebellious."

In the wake of the Charleston church shooting in June 2015, The Birmingham News highlighted this history and called for a removal of the mascot. Meanwhile, the school superintendent called it 'a "point of contention for some members" of the community'. By early July 2015, some Vestavia Hills residents wrote an op-ed in The Birmingham News calling on the school board to change its name. By the middle of July 2015, comedian John Oliver made fun of the claim that it was "heritage, not hate" on national television. He argued, "Your logo is a plantation owner. [...] And saying that the image of a plantation owner is not used in a racist way is a bit like arguing the Hitachi magic wand is only used as a back massager."

The Vestavia Hills City Schools System decided to keep the Rebels name but initiate a "rebranding" process. The new branding was approved by the school board on May 18, 2016. The new branding replaced the objectionable mascot and instituted the new slogan "You play one Rebel you play us all."

Academics
Vestavia has 150 courses available on yearly basis. Vestavia offers a number of AP courses (World History, U.S. History, European History, Human Geography, English Language & Lit., Calculus AB, Calculus BC, Computer Science Principles, Psychology, Physics 1, Statistics, Biology, Chemistry, French, Latin, Spanish, German, Government, Economics, Studio Art, Environmental Science, and Comparative Government). Vestavia also offers Honors courses for all core subjects to all grades. Dual Enrollment classes are available for both English and Math.

The school has a music department. It publishes a newspaper, The Vedette, and a literary and visual arts magazine, The Muse.

Achievements
The school was recognized with the national Blue Ribbon School of Excellence by the United States Department of Education in both 1991 and 2009.

The debate team has won seven national championships, with the added distinction of being the first team in history to win both Lincoln-Douglas Debate and Policy Debate in the National Speech and Debate Association's National Speech and Debate Tournament. In addition, only one other school has won two national championships in Lincoln-Douglas debate at the Tournament of Champions national high school debate tournament.

The math team amassed 15 first place finishes at the Mu Alpha Theta national championships from 1987 to 2006. Over the same period, the team dominated most regional events throughout the Southeast, including four victories at the Furman University Wylie Mathematics Tournament from 1999 to 2004.

In 2008, the school won the "Adam Smith Division" in the Council for Economic Education's National Economics Challenge, and its students finished runner up in the national finals of the 22nd annual We the People: The Citizen and the Constitution competition in 2009.

Athletics
Vestavia Hills High School fields varsity teams in football, cheerleading, basketball,  baseball,  soccer, wrestling, golf, tennis, softball, swimming, volleyball, cross country, and indoor and outdoor track and field.

VHHS has won AHSAA state championships in the following sports:
 Baseball (1991, 1992, 1994, 1995, 1996, 1997, 1998, 1999, 2000)
 Boys' Basketball (1992, 2009)
 Girls' Basketball (1987)
 Boys' Cross Country (1987, 2013)
 Girls' Cross Country (1981)
 Football (1980, 1998)
 Boys' Golf (1991, 1994)
 Girls' Golf (1973, 1974)
 Girls' Indoor Track (2005)
 Boys' Soccer (1991, 1995, 2013, 2014)
 Girls' Soccer (2001, 2005, 2007)
 Boys' Tennis (1995, 2011, 2012, 2013, 2014)
 Girls' Tennis (1989, 1991, 1992, 1993, 1998, 1999, 2007, 2008, 2009, 2010, 2013, 2016)
 Boys' Outdoor Track & Field (2008)
 Wrestling (1976, 1985, 1986, 1991, 1993, 1994, 1998, 1999, 2000, 2001, 2007, 2008, 2009, 2016, 2017)

Buddy Anderson Field (at Thompson Reynolds Stadium) is home of the Vestavia Hills Rebels football team. The field is named after current head coach Buddy Anderson. Anderson has been coaching at Vestavia since 1972, and has remained the head coach since 1978.

Performing arts
VHHS has a competitive show choir, "Singers".

Notable alumni
 Colter Bean (1995), Major League Baseball pitcher (New York Yankees)
 Steven Black, professional football player
 Chris Hammond (1984), Major League Baseball pitcher
 Josh Hancock (1996), former Major League Baseball pitcher (St. Louis Cardinals)
 Trey Hardee (2002), track and field athlete, Olympian
 Smylie Kaufman (2010), professional golfer and winner on PGA Tour
 Jo Kittinger (1974), children's book author
 Rebecca Moore, Miss Alabama USA 2006
 Michael Papajohn (1983), actor, film producer and stunt performer
 Vann Stuedeman, head coach of the Mississippi State Lady Bulldogs softball team
 Jordan Swing, professional basketball player
 Trevor Terndrup, Tommy Putnam and Tyler Ritter, members of alt-rock band Moon Taxi

References

External links 

 Vestavia Hills High School

Educational institutions established in 1970
Public high schools in Alabama
Schools in Jefferson County, Alabama
1970 establishments in Alabama